The Cross Island Line (CRL) is a high capacity mass rapid transit (MRT) line under development in Singapore that will run in a generally east–west direction from Changi to Jurong Industrial Estate via Loyang, Pasir Ris, Hougang, Ang Mo Kio, Sin Ming, Bukit Timah, Clementi and the West Coast. From Pasir Ris, the line will branch off to Punggol. Coloured lime on official maps, the  line will replace the East West Line as the longest line on the MRT network upon its complete opening by the 2040s, serving about 27 stations. It will be the sixth MRT line to be completely automated and driverless, as well as the fourth high capacity MRT line.

Plans for the line were first announced in 2013. The CRL is envisioned to serve various key hubs including the Jurong Lake District and the Punggol Digital District, offering an alternative east–west connection to alleviate passenger load on the East West line. Shortly after the announcement, calls were made by some nature groups to divert the line tunnels away from the Central Catchment Nature Reserve (CCNR). Nevertheless, the Government ultimately decided after years of assessments and deliberation to continue with the original direct route in 2019, citing commuting time and economic factors as well as long-term energy consumption. The alignment and stations for CRL1 were finalised in 2019, followed by the Punggol branch in 2020 and Phase 2 in 2022. The proposed full line is expected to have a daily ridership of over one million in the long term, and to cost an estimated S$40.7 billion.

History

Announcement
The Cross Island Line was first announced by Transport Minister Lui Tuck Yew on 17 January 2013. The line was planned to relieve congestion on the existing East West Line and slated to begin at Changi on Singapore's eastern coast, passing through the major eastern towns including Pasir Ris, Hougang and Ang Mo Kio. From this point, it would proceed further west toward Bukit Timah, Clementi and West Coast, before terminating in the Jurong Industrial Estate. A branch line was to connect the mainline to Punggol. The line was planned to be 50 km long and open in 2030. Studies on the Cross Island Line began in May 2013.

Line alignment 

Since its announcement, there has been controversy over the alignment of the line's Bukit Timah stretch crossing the Central Catchment Nature Reserve (CCNR) and MacRitchie Reservoir, which prompted the Nature Society Singapore to call for the line's realignment. Environmental groups have urged the Government not to build the MRT line under the CCNR.

On 19 July 2013, the NSS put forward two proposed alternative alignments: a northern route that would run close to the Thomson–East Coast Line, heading west towards Mandai, Sungei Kadut and Gali Batu before terminating at Choa Chu Kang, and a southern route skirting the reserve along Lornie Road. Engineers noted the feasibility of constructing the line through the reserve without impacting the environment, though one said the decision "shouldn’t be just based on transport".

A tender to assess the environmental impact of the line was called for on 24 February 2014 to facilitate civil works for the line. In July 2014, the LTA appointed Environmental Resources Management (S) Pte Ltd (ERM) to conduct the Environmental Impact Assessment (EIA) for the section of the line around and through the nature reserve. The EIA was to be conducted in two phases, with the first studying the ecosystem and physical conditions along both the straight and skirting alignments, as well as assessing how construction and operation of the line would affect the CCNR. The Phase 1 EIA report was released in February 2016.

Soil investigation works along the CCNR began in February 2017 and by October, was announced to be nearing completion by the end of the year. On 20 March 2018, the LTA declared that the findings on the environmental impact of drilling and other initial works would be completed later that year. The Phase 2 EIA report was released in September 2019. On 4 December 2019, the Ministry of Transport confirmed that the direct route underneath the CCNR had been chosen, with mitigating factors such as tunnelling deeper than usual under the CCNR as well as no surface works in the area. The construction cost is also expected to be $2 billion lower than the alternative alignments.

Phase 1

On 25 January 2019, Transport Minister Khaw Boon Wan announced the alignment of CRL Phase 1. This segment of the line, spanning , consists of 12 stations from Aviation Park station to Bright Hill station. A new 57-hectare Changi East Depot was to be built to serve the line. CRL Phase 1 was expected to be completed in 2029.

Punggol Extension 
On 10 March 2020, a branch line from Pasir Ris station to Punggol station was announced.The  Punggol extension, consisting of four stations between this station and Punggol, was expected to be completed in 2031. However, the restrictions imposed on construction works due to the COVID-19 pandemic has led to delays and the completion dates for CRL1 and CRLe were pushed by one year to 2030 and 2032 respectively. Construction of CRL1 officially began on 18 January 2023.

Phase 2
In December 2021, as part of a virtual exhibition by the LTA, a future system map depicted a series of 11 unnamed stations on the western half of the CRL. The map also showed the western segment interchanging with existing and under-construction stations including King Albert Park, Clementi and Jurong Pier. The line was shown to terminate at Gul Circle station. The map, along with the virtual exhibition, has since been offline. The LTA explained that the route was a "conceptual alignment" yet to be finalised, with the interchange stations being tentative.

On 20 September 2022, Transport Minister S. Iswaran confirmed the stations for Phase 2 of the CRL. Expected to open in 2032, the  segment spans six stations from Turf City station to Jurong Lake District station. Construction of these stations is expected to start in 2023.

Phase 3
Based on tender documents, The Straits Times projected in February 2022 that civil works for the CRL might be completed by end-2033, with operations beginning in 2034 or later. The CRL is to be completed in three phases. However, the LTA stated that the exact timeline is unclear and will only be known with the completion of advanced engineering studies. The Phase 3 segment is predicted to have five stations, with tentative stations CR21 and CR24 on the Phase 3 segment interchanging with the Jurong Region line and the East West line. An additional shell station might be built as part of the segment. Engineering studies for the new phases have not yet been completed at this stage.

Future Plans
In conceptual plans for the redevelopment of Paya Lebar Air Base, an additional station (labeled "Paya Lebar Air Base") has been proposed between Defu and Tampines North stations to serve the new developments. An extension towards Changi Airport Terminal 5 is considered, with "" being reserved for the station.

Network and operations

Route and services

The CRL is planned to run in a generally east–west direction, being an alternative route to the existing East West (EWL) and North East (NEL) lines. At least half of the CRL stations are to interchange with existing lines, providing alternative routes for commuters. The LTA is also studying a possible extension to link to the future Changi Airport Terminal 5.

The Government briefly considered in 2014 implementing an express service for the CRL. However, Transport Minister Khaw announced in 2018 that express services were considered not feasible, citing the need to dedicate more infrastructure for extra tracks and additional signalling systems.

Stations

Names stated are working names, except for the existing interchange stations.

Legend

List

The Cross Island Line's numbering scheme reserves the station code '' for a future extension towards Changi Airport.

Depots

Notes and references

Notes

References

External links
 LTA official website on the Cross Island Line

Mass Rapid Transit (Singapore) lines
Proposed public transport in Singapore
2030 in rail transport